Ctenucha albipars is a moth of the family Erebidae. It is found in Bolivia.

References

albipars
Moths described in 1901